The Baxter Cliffs is a long stretch of coastal cliff on the south coast of Western Australia.

The Baxter Cliffs are up to 80 metres high and extend for almost 200 kilometres along the coast, from Point  Culver in the west, which marks the northern end of the Israelite Plain, northeastwards to Twilight Cove in the east, which is the transition from the cliffs to the coastal Roe Plains. Toolinna Cove is the only place along the Baxter Cliffs where a boat can be landed.

The Baxter Cliffs are part of a long erosional escarpment which extends east and west across the Eucla Basin sedimentary formation. Other portions of the escarpment include the Hampton Tableland north of the Roe Plains, and the Bunda Cliffs east of the Roe Plains in South Australia.

The cliffs are named after John Baxter, a companion of the explorer Edward John Eyre, who was murdered there by two Aboriginals from Eyre's exploration party in April 1841.

References

Great Australian Bight
Goldfields-Esperance
Nuytsland Nature Reserve
South coast of Western Australia
Cliffs of Australia